Lophopleurella capensis is a species of sea snail, a marine gastropod mollusk in the family Oxynoidae.

Lophopleurella capensis is the only species in the genus Lophopleurella.

The specific name "capensis" is from the Latin language, meaning "of the Cape", i.e. from the Cape Province".

Distribution 
The type locality for this species is South Africa.

Description 
This species was originally described under name Lobiger (Lophopleura) capensis by German malacologist Johannes Thiele in 1912 as a result of the Gauss Expedition (1901–1903), that was the first German expedition to Antarctica.

Johannes Thiele described it very briefly stating, that it "has wing-shaped attachments on sides of the body and very small wing on its shell".

German malacologist Adolf Michael Zilch established a new genus Lophopleurella Zilch, 1956 for this species, because the name Lophopleura Ragonot, 1891 had already been occupied and used for a genus of lepidopterans from family Pyralidae. Zilch only created the new generic name without a review of the genus.

References

Oxynoidae
Gastropods described in 1912